Lampi is a Finnish surname, meaning pond. Notable people with the surname include:

 Veli Lampi
 Jussi Lampi
 Mandi Lampi
 Vilho Lampi
 Phil Lampi

See also
 Johann Baptist von Lampi the Elder, Austrian painter
 Johann Baptist von Lampi the Younger, Austrian painter
 Lampinen

Finnish-language surnames
Surnames of Finnish origin